Redfieldia, known as blowout grass, is a monotypic genus in the grass family (Poaceae). The sole species, Redfieldia flexuosa, is native to sandhills in the western and central United States. The plants grow in small clusters, protecting each other from the harsh desert conditions.

Description
The inflorescence is an open panicle with solitary spikelets on narrow pedicels. Each spikelet has between two and six florets. The glumes have pointed tips and are narrower than the fertile lemma. The lemma has three veins and hairy margins. The glumes are persistent after fruiting. It spreads with elongated rhizomes.

Distribution and habitat
According to the United States Natural Resources Conservation Service (NRCS), blowout grass is found in thirteen states, including Arizona, Colorado, Illinois, Kansas, Montana, North Dakota, Nebraska, New Mexico, Oklahoma, South Dakota, Texas, Utah, and Wyoming.

See also
Blowout (geology)
Sand dune stabilization

References

Chloridoideae
Endemic flora of the United States
Monotypic Poaceae genera